Georges River Council is a local government area located in the St George region of Sydney located south of the CBD, in New South Wales, Australia.  The Council was formed on 12 May 2016 from the merger of the Hurstville City Council and Kogarah City Council.

The mayor of Georges River Council is Nick Katris, who was elected by his fellow councillors on 30 December 2021.

Suburbs and localities in the local government area 
Suburbs in the Georges River Council area are:

Georges River Council also manages and maintains the following localities:

Demographics
Aboriginal and Torres Strait Islander people made up 0.5 per cent of the population; significantly below the NSW and Australian averages of 2.9 and 2.8 per cent respectively. The median age of people in Georges River Council was 37 years; marginally lower than the national median of 38 years. Children aged 0 – 14 years made up 16.8 per cent of the population and people aged 65 years and over made up 15.3 per cent of the population. Of people in the area aged 15 years and over, 53.1 per cent were married and 9.1 per cent were either divorced or separated.

At the 2016 census, the proportion of residents in the Georges River local government area who stated their ancestry as Australian or Anglo-Saxon approached 29 per cent of all residents. In excess of 51 per cent of all residents in Georges River Council nominated a religious affiliation with Christianity at the 2016 census, which was below the national average of 57.7 per cent. Meanwhile, as at the census date, compared to the national average, households in the Georges River local government area had a significantly higher than average proportion (56.1 per cent) where two or more languages are spoken (national average was 22.2 per cent); and a lower proportion (42.3 per cent) where English only was spoken at home (national average was 72.7 per cent).

Council
Georges River Council comprises fifteen Councillors elected proportionally, with three Councillors elected in five wards. Councillors are elected for a fixed four-year term of office, with the first term to last for three years. The Mayor is elected by Councillors for a period of two years, the Deputy Mayor is elected for one year. The council first met in the Kogarah Civic Centre on 19 May 2016 and the new seat of the council is the Georges River Civic Centre (formerly Hurstville Civic Centre) in MacMahon Street, Hurstville.

Current composition
The most recent full council election was held on 4 December 2021, and the makeup of the Council by order of election, is as follows:

Council logo
On 3 April 2017, Georges River Council adopted its new logo and branding as required by the NSW state government proclamation. The logo, one of three designed by council staff, was adopted following a community consultation process which looked at the three options. The successful choice, featuring a dragon (which is representative of the St George region and appeared on Hurstville council's logo and coat of arms), was chosen due to "perceived meaning, diversity, relevance to the local area including connections to St George and the logo’s representation to the community including links to multiculturalism and sport".

The consultations resulted in several changes before its unveiling, including changing the direction of the dragon, the adoption of the red colour from the interim council typeface logo used since amalgamation, and the addition of a Port Jackson fig tree leaf motif, to represent the indigenous heritage of the area.

History

Early history
The traditional Aboriginal inhabitants of the land now in the Georges River Council area were thought to be the Cadigal and Biddegal indigenous people.

Local government history

The "Municipal District of Kogarah" was proclaimed on 23 December 1885 and the District’s boundaries commenced at the intersection of the Illawarra Railway Line with the northern shore of George’s River. The Municipal District was re-named the "Municipality of Kogarah" following the passage of the Municipalities Act, 1897 on 6 December 1897. On 22 December 1916 and 1 January 1969, parts of Rockdale Municipality were transferred to Kogarah. In 1993, following the passing of the new Local Government Act, the Municipality of Kogarah became known as "Kogarah Council". Kogarah Council was proclaimed a city in 2008.

In December 1920, Kogarah combined with the councils of Rockdale, Hurstville, and Bexley to form the St George County Council. The elected County Council was established to provide electricity to the Kogarah, Rockdale, Hurstville, and Bexley areas and ceased to exist when it was amalgamated with the Sydney County Council on 1 January 1980.

On 25 March 1887 the NSW Government Gazette published a proclamation declaring the "Municipal District of Hurstville". On 28 June 1900, a further proclamation declared Bexley Ward of Hurstville be separated and named the Borough of Bexley. On 28 June 1900 a new proclamation declared the "Municipality of Hurstville". On 2 August 1922, a part of Hurstville was transferred to the Sutherland Shire, on 5 December 1924 part of Canterbury Municipality was transferred to Hurstville, and on 1 January 1931 part of Hurstville was given to Kogarah Municipality. On 25 November 1988 Hurstville was proclaimed a city, becoming the "Hurstville City Council".

Efforts to bring about a unified council for the St George area were raised regularly since 1901 and the 1946 Clancy Royal Commission into local government boundaries recommended the amalgamation of the municipalities of Hurstville, Kogarah, Rockdale and Bexley. In the following act of parliament passed in December 1948, the Local Government (Areas) Act 1948, the recommendations of the commission were modified, leading only to the merger of Bexley and Rockdale councils. A merger was again considered in the 1970s, but 1977 plebiscites run in Hustville and Kogarah rejected the idea. A further idea of amalgamating Kogarah and Hurstville with Sutherland Shire to the south was raised in 1999 but did not progress.

Establishment of Georges River Council
However these proposals met with some opposition, including those in favour of a single "St George Council" combining Hurstville, Kogarah and Rockdale (which was to amalgamate with the City of Botany Bay). Despite these concerns however, on 12 May 2016, with the release of the Local Government (Council Amalgamations) Proclamation 2016, the Georges River Council was formed from Hurstville and Kogarah city councils, with former Sutherland Shire General Manager, John Rayner as administrator. The first meeting of the Georges River Council was held at Kogarah Civic Centre on 19 May 2016.

Heritage listings
The Georges River Council has a number of heritage-listed sites, including:
 Beverly Hills, East Hills railway: Beverly Hills railway station
 Blakehurst, 9 Stuart Crescent: Thurlow House
 Carss Park, 74 Carwar Avenue: Carss Cottage
 Oatley, Illawarra railway: Oatley railway station
 Oatley, over Georges River: Old Como railway bridge
 Penshurst, 663-665 King Georges Road: West Maling
 Penshurst, Laycock Road: Penshurst Reservoirs

See also

 Local government areas of New South Wales

References

External links
Georges River Council Website

 
Local government areas in Sydney
2016 establishments in Australia
Georges River